Kalk Kapelle is an underground station on the Cologne Stadtbahn lines 1 and 9, located in Cologne. The station lies at the intersection if the Kalker Hauptstraße and Kapellenstraße streets in the district of Kalk.

The station was opened in 1980 and consists of a mezzanine and two side platforms with two rail tracks.

Notable places nearby 
 Kalk District Town Hall
 Kalk Chapel
 St. Mary's Church, Kalk

See also 
 List of Cologne KVB stations

References

External links 
 
 station info page 

Cologne KVB stations
Kalk, Cologne
Railway stations in Germany opened in 1980